The Chile national rugby sevens team is a minor national sevens side. In the 2008 USA Sevens they lost to Australia 24-14 in the Shield finals. In preparation for the 2018 Rugby World Cup Sevens they toured Fiji, a month before the World Cup. Chile was invited to the 2021 World Rugby Sevens Series that was held in Canada, in Vancouver and Edmonton.

They have participated at two Olympic repechage tournaments, in 2016 and 2020, but were unsuccessful to qualify for the Olympics both times.

Tournament history

Rugby World Cup Sevens

Olympics

Pan American Games

World Rugby Sevens Series

Players

Current squad 
The following 12 players were called up for the 2022 Rugby World Cup Sevens.

See also
Chile women's national rugby sevens team

References

Rugby union in Chile
Chile national rugby union team
National rugby sevens teams